Harrisia (applecactus and moonlight cactus) is a genus of night blooming cacti native to Argentina, Paraguay, Brazil, Bolivia, Uruguay, the Greater Antilles, the Bahamas, and the U.S. state of Florida. The genus is named after William Harris, an important botanist of Jamaica. There are about 20 species.

Harrisia cactus is an exotic invasive in Queensland, Africa, and the U.S. state of Hawaii.

The genera Eriocereus (A.Berger) Riccob. and Roseocereus Backeb. have been brought into synonymy with this genus.

Species include:
Harrisia aboriginum
Harrisia adscendens
Harrisia balansae (invasive in the Little Karoo, South Africa, biocontrolled by Hypogeococcus)
Harrisia bonplandii
Harrisia divaricata
Harrisia donae-antoniae
Harrisia eriophora
Harrisia fragrans
Harrisia gracilis
Harrisia jusbertii
Harrisia martinii
Harrisia pomanensis
Harrisia portoricensis
Harrisia regelii
Harrisia simpsonii
Harrisia tetracantha
Harrisia tortuosa

References

 
Cactoideae genera
Cacti of North America
Cacti of South America
Flora of the Caribbean